DeWayne Jay Scales (born December 28, 1958) is an American former professional basketball player.

A 6'8" forward from Louisiana State University, Scales played in the NBA from 1980 to 1984 as a member of the New York Knicks and Washington Bullets. Scales averaged 4.6 points per game in his NBA career.

Notes

1958 births
Living people
African-American basketball players
Albany Patroons players
American expatriate basketball people in the Philippines
American men's basketball players
Basketball players from Dallas
Cincinnati Slammers players
Crispa Redmanizers players
Detroit Spirits players
Evansville Thunder players
LSU Tigers basketball players
New York Knicks draft picks
New York Knicks players
Ohio Mixers players
Philippine Basketball Association imports
Small forwards
Washington Bullets players
21st-century African-American people
20th-century African-American sportspeople